Bandar Mohammed Mohammed Saeed Al-Ahbabi (Arabic:بندر محمد محمد سعيد الأحبابي) (born 9 July 1990) is an Emirati professional association footballer who plays for Al Ain.

Academic career
Bandar began playing football when he was ten years old, where his physical education teacher Ismail helped him enroll for Al Ain FC's youth academy. His future as a professional player was about to end at age 12, when his father withdrew him from the academy because of its influences on his grades. Despite this, his mother persuaded him to play again.

International career
On 23 February 2014, Al Ahbabi was called up the first time to the UAE senior team for a 2015 AFC Asian Cup qualification match against Uzbekistan. He was left out of the starting line-up.
On 11 June 2015, he made his debut with the national team in a 3–0 defeat to South Korea, starting the match and wearing the number 21 jersey.

Career statistic

Club

Notes

International goals
Scores and results list the United Arab Emirates' goal tally first.

Honours

Club
Al Ain
Arabian Gulf League (2): 2011–12, 2017–18, 2021–22
UAE League Cup (1): 2021–22
UAE President's Cup (1): 2017–18
AFC Champions League Runners-up: 2016
Arabian Gulf Super Cup Runners-up: 2018
FIFA Club World Cup Runners-up: 2018

Individual
AGL Player of the Month: October 2019
AGL Dream Team: 2018–19
 AFC Asian Cup Team of the Tournament: 2019

References

External links

 

Emirati footballers
1990 births
Living people
Al Ain FC players
Al Dhafra FC players
Baniyas Club players
Footballers at the 2014 Asian Games
2019 AFC Asian Cup players
UAE Pro League players
Association football wingers
Asian Games competitors for the United Arab Emirates
United Arab Emirates international footballers